Kobi Mor is an Israeli footballer who plays for Hapoel Umm al-Fahm.

Honours
Liga Leumit
Winner (1): 2016-17

References

1993 births
Living people
Jewish Israeli sportspeople
Israeli footballers
Maccabi Yavne F.C. players
Sektzia Ness Ziona F.C. players
Hapoel Herzliya F.C. players
Maccabi Netanya F.C. players
Hapoel Petah Tikva F.C. players
Hapoel Ironi Kiryat Shmona F.C. players
Hapoel Nof HaGalil F.C. players
F.C. Kafr Qasim players
Hapoel Umm al-Fahm F.C. players
Liga Leumit players
Israeli Premier League players
People from Or Yehuda
Footballers from Tel Aviv District
Association football fullbacks